Sportsko društvo Crvena zvezda, commonly abbreviated as SD Crvena zvezda, is a multi-sport club from Belgrade, Serbia.

SD Crvena zvezda's clubs have won 816 trophies, including 3 Intercontinental trophies, 9 European trophies, 17 Regional trophies, 556 National Leagues, 215 National Cups and 16 National Super Cups and League Cups. SD Crvena zvezda's athletes have won 39 Olympic medals, including 6 gold, 23 silver and 10 bronze medals.

SD Crvena zvezda is the most successful multi-sport club in Serbia.

Clubs
SD Crvena zvezda has sport clubs in the following disciplines:

Honours and achievements

Athletics

Men
 National Championships
 Winners (40): 1953, 1954, 1955, 1967, 1968, 1969, 1970, 1971, 1972, 1973, 1974, 1975, 1976, 1977, 1978, 1979, 1980, 1981, 1982, 1983, 1985, 1986, 1987, 1988, 1989, 1990, 1992, 1993, 1994, 1995, 2002, 2008, 2009, 2010, 2011, 2017, 2018, 2019, 2020, 2021
 National Cups
 Winners (43): 1966, 1967, 1968, 1969, 1970, 1971, 1972, 1973, 1974, 1975, 1976, 1977, 1978, 1979, 1980, 1981, 1982, 1983, 1984, 1985, 1986, 1987, 1988, 1989, 1990, 1992, 1993, 1994, 1995, 2002, 2003, 2004, 2005, 2006, 2007, 2008, 2009, 2010, 2011, 2012, 2015, 2016, 2019
 Cross country running
 Winners (19): 1948, 1953, 1954, 1959, 1960, 1971, 1972, 1973, 1977, 1979, 1980, 1985, 1986, 1992, 1993, 1994, 2006, 2020, 2022
 European Champion Clubs Cup
 Winners (1): 1989

Women
 National Championships
 Winners (23): 1986, 1987, 1988, 1989, 1992, 1993, 1994, 1995, 2002, 2007, 2008, 2009, 2010, 2011, 2012, 2013, 2014, 2015, 2017, 2018, 2019, 2020, 2021
 National Cups
 Winners (21): 1986, 1987, 1988, 1989, 1992, 1993, 1994, 2002, 2003, 2004, 2005, 2006, 2008, 2009, 2010, 2011, 2013, 2014, 2015, 2016, 2019
 Cross country running
 Winners (6): 1982, 1993, 2002, 2017, 2018, 2019

Auto racing
National Championships – 11

 Oval track racing
 Winners (5): 1974, 1988, 2017, 2018, 2019
 Rallying
 Winners (2): 1974, 1975
 Kart racing
 Winners (4): 2017, 2018, 2020, 2022

Basketball

KK Crvena zvezda
National Championships – 22 (record)

 Yugoslav League
 Winners (12): 1946, 1947, 1948, 1949, 1950, 1951, 1952, 1953, 1954, 1955, 1968–69, 1971–72
 Serbia and Montenegro League
 Winners (3): 1992–93, 1993–94, 1997–98
 Serbian League
 Winners (7): 2014–15, 2015–16, 2016–17, 2017–18, 2018–19, 2020–21, 2021–22

National Cups – 12

 Yugoslav Cup
 Winners (3): 1970–71, 1972–73, 1974–75
 Radivoj Korać Cup
 Winners (9): 2003–04, 2005–06, 2012–13, 2013–14, 2014–15, 2016–17, 2020–21, 2021–22, 2022–23

International titles – 8

 FIBA Saporta Cup
 Winners (1): 1973–74
 ABA League
 Winners (6): 2014–15, 2015–16, 2016–17, 2018–19, 2020–21, 2021–22
 ABA League Supercup
 Winners (1): 2018

ŽKK Crvena zvezda
National Championships – 33 (record)

 Yugoslav League
 Winners (25): 1946, 1947, 1948, 1949, 1950, 1951, 1952, 1953, 1954, 1955, 1956, 1957, 1958, 1959, 1960, 1963, 1972–73, 1975–76, 1976–77, 1977–78, 1978–79, 1979–80, 1980–81, 1988–89, 1991–92
 Serbia and Montenegro League
 Winners (3): 1992–93, 1995–96, 2003–04
 Serbian League
 Winners (5): 2016–17, 2017–18, 2018–19, 2020–21, 2021–22

National Cups – 14 (record)

 Yugoslav Cup
 Winners (6): 1972–73, 1973–74, 1975–76, 1978–79, 1980–81, 1991–92
 Serbia and Montenegro Cup
 Winners (4): 1993–94, 1994–95, 2002–03, 2003–04
 Milan Ciga Vasojević Cup
 Winners (4): 2015–16, 2016–17, 2018–19, 2021–22

International titles – 1

 EuroLeague Women
 Winners (1): 1978–79

Bowling
 National Championships
 Winners (6): 1991–92, 1992–93, 1998–99, 2001–02, 2002–03, 2003–04
 National Cups
 Winners (1): 1985

Boxing
 National Championships
 Winners (3): 1967, 1969, 1970
 Regional League
 Winners (1): 2021–22

Bridge
 National Championships
 Winners (5): 1996, 2001, 2008, 2015, 2020
 National Cups
 Winners (2): 1997, 1998

Chess

Men
 National Championships
 Winners (10): 1947, 1948, 1950, 1967, 1968, 1970, 1975, 1976, 1977, 1981
 National Cups
 Winners (8): 1966, 1969, 1970, 1972, 1973, 1975, 1976, 1986

Women
 National Cups
 Winners (2): 1983, 1992

Fencing

Men
National Championships – 52 (record)

 Épée
 Winners (9): 1950, 1951, 1958, 1964, 2001, 2003, 2004, 2016, 2019
 Foil
 Winners (8): 1951, 1952, 1958, 1960, 2001, 2002, 2021, 2022
 Sabre
 Winners (35): 1970, 1972, 1974, 1975, 1976, 1977, 1978, 1979, 1980, 1981, 1982, 1983, 1988, 1989, 1991, 1992, 1995, 1996, 1997, 1998, 1999, 2000, 2001, 2002, 2003, 2007, 2009, 2010, 2011, 2012, 2013, 2015, 2016, 2017, 2018

National Cups – 5

 Sabre
 Winners (5): 1981, 1984, 1991, 1992, 1993

Women
National Championships – 53 (record)

 Foil
 Winners (36): 1952, 1954, 1956, 1957, 1959, 1960, 1961, 1965, 1966, 1967, 1968, 1970, 1971, 1974, 1976, 1979, 1991, 2002, 2003, 2005, 2006, 2007, 2008, 2009, 2010, 2011, 2012, 2013, 2014, 2016, 2017, 2018, 2019, 2020, 2021, 2022
 Épée
 Winners (12): 1991, 2002, 2003, 2004, 2007, 2008, 2009, 2010, 2011, 2012, 2013, 2019
 Sabre
 Winners (5): 2009, 2010, 2011, 2012, 2015

National Cups – 4

 Épée
 Winners (2): 1989, 1990
 Foil
 Winners (2): 1990, 1991

Football

FK Crvena zvezda
National Championships – 33 (record)

 People's Republic of Serbia League
 Winners (1): 1945–46
 Yugoslav First League
 Winners (19): 1951, 1952–53, 1955–56, 1956–57, 1958–59, 1959–60, 1963–64, 1967–68, 1968–69, 1969–70, 1972–73, 1976–77, 1979–80, 1980–81, 1983–84, 1987–88, 1989–90, 1990–91, 1991–92
 First League of Serbia and Montenegro
 Winners (5): 1994–95, 1999–2000, 2000–01, 2003–04, 2005–06
 Serbian SuperLiga
 Winners (8): 2006–07, 2013–14, 2015–16, 2017–18, 2018–19, 2019–20, 2020–21, 2021–22

National Cups – 26 (record)

 Yugoslav Cup
 Winners (12): 1948, 1949, 1950, 1957–58, 1958–59, 1963–64, 1967–68, 1969–70, 1970–71, 1981–82, 1984–85, 1989–90
 Serbia and Montenegro Cup
 Winners (9): 1992–93, 1994–95, 1995–96, 1996–97, 1998–99, 1999–2000, 2001–02, 2003–04, 2005–06
 Serbian Cup
 Winners (5): 2006–07, 2009–10, 2011–12, 2020–21, 2021–22

National Super Cups – 2 (record)
 Yugoslav Super Cup
 Winners (2): 1969, 1971

National League Cup – 1 (shared record)
 Yugoslav League Cup
 Winners (1): 1972–73

National Champions League – 2 (record)
 Yugoslav Summer Champions League
 Winners (2): 1971, 1973

International titles – 4

 European Cup / UEFA Champions League
 Winners (1): 1990–91
 Intercontinental Cup
 Winners (1): 1991
 Mitropa Cup
 Winners (2): 1958, 1967–68

ŽFK Crvena zvezda
Serbian Cup
Winners (1): 2017–18

Futsal
Serbian Prva Futsal Liga
Winners (1): 2019–20

Golf
 National Championships
 Winners (1): 2022

Handball
National Championships – 9

 Yugoslav League
 Winners (2): 1954–55, 1955–56
 Serbia and Montenegro League
 Winners (5): 1995–96, 1996–97, 1997–98, 2003–04, 2005–06
 Serbian League
 Winners (2): 2006–07, 2007–08

National Cups – 5

 Yugoslav Cup
 Winners (1): 1955–56
 Serbia and Montenegro Cup
 Winners (3): 1994–95, 1995–96, 2003–04
 Serbian Cup
 Winners (1): 2016–17

National Super Cup – 1

 Serbian Super Cup
 Winners (1): 2017

Ice hockey
National Championships – 9

 Serbian Hockey League
 Winners (9): 1991–92, 1992–93, 1995–96, 1996–97, 2004–05, 2018, 2019, 2020, 2021

National Cups – 5

 Yugoslav Ice Hockey Cup
 Winners (1): 1980
 Serbian Hockey Cup
 Winners (4): 1992, 1996, 1997, 1998

International titles – 1

 International Hockey League
 Winners (1): 2018–19

Judo

Men
 National Championships
 Winners (8): 1989, 1991, 1995, 2016, 2018, 2019, 2021, 2022
 National Cups
 Winners (2): 1989, 1991

Women
 National Championships
 Winners (4): 2018, 2019, 2021, 2022

Karate

Men
 National Championships
 Winners (9): 1981, 1990 (2×), 1997, 2019, 2020 (2×), 2022 (2×)
 National Cups
 Winners (2): 1996, 1997
 European Club Championship
 Winners (3): 1997, 1998, 2021
 Intercontinental Club Championship
 Winners (2): 2013, 2015
 Mediterranean Club Championship
 Winners (2): 2016 (2×)

Women
 National Championships
 Winners (3): 1980, 1981, 1983
 National Cups
 Winners (1): 1996

Rowing
 National Championships
 Winners (11): 1949, 1950, 1951, 1978, 1979, 1980, 1982, 1986, 1999, 2010, 2018
 National Cups
 Winners (4): 1996, 2000, 2018, 2019

Rugby league
 Serbian Rugby League Championship
 Winners (7): 2013–14, 2017, 2018, 2019, 2020, 2021, 2022
 Serbian Rugby League Cup
 Winners (4): 2015–16, 2018, 2019, 2020
 Serbian Super Cup
 Winners (4): 2015–16, 2018, 2019, 2020
 Balkan Super League
 Winners (4): 2018, 2019, 2021, 2022

Rugby league nines

Women
 Serbian Rugby League Championship
 Winners (1): 2019

Rugby union
 Rugby Championship of Serbia
 Winners (2): 2015, 2016
 Rugby Cup of Serbia
 Winners (2): 2014, 2016

Rugby sevens
 Rugby Championship of Serbia
 Winners (4): 2014, 2015, 2016, 2017

Shooting

Men
 National Championships
 Winners (9): 1981, 1982 (2×), 1983 (2×), 1986, 1994, 1999, 2007
 National Cups
 Winners (2): 1998, 2002

Women
 National Championships
 Winners (39): 1992 (2×), 1993 (2×), 1994 (2×), 1995 (2×), 1996 (2×), 1997, 1998 (2×), 1999, 2001 (2×), 2002, 2004, 2005 (2×), 2006 (2×), 2007, 2008 (2×), 2009 (2×), 2010 (2×), 2011 (2×), 2012 (2×), 2013 (2×), 2014 (2×), 2015, 2016
 National Cups
 Winners (3): 2013, 2015, 2016

Swimming
 National Championships
 Winners (4): 1975, 1977, 1978, 1992
 National Cups
 Winners (2): 1975, 1977

Table tennis
 National Championships
 Winners (10): 1992–93, 2000–01, 2001–02, 2003–04, 2004–05, 2009–10, 2014–15, 2015–16, 2016–17, 2020–21

Taekwondo

Men
National Championships – 5

 Hyeong
 Winners (4): 1998, 1999, 2000, 2001
 Sparring
 Winners (1): 2001

Women
National Championships – 1

 Sparring
 Winners (1): 2000

Tennis

Men
 National Championships
 Winners (25): 1974, 1975, 1978, 1979, 1982, 1983, 1984, 1998, 1999, 2000, 2002, 2004, 2006, 2008, 2009, 2010, 2011, 2012, 2013, 2014, 2015, 2016, 2017, 2018, 2022

Women
 National Championships
 Winners (14): 1998, 1999, 2001, 2002, 2003, 2004, 2005, 2006, 2007, 2008, 2011, 2014, 2015, 2018

Volleyball

OK Crvena zvezda
National Championships – 12

 Yugoslav Volleyball Championship
 Winners (5): 1951, 1954, 1956, 1957, 1973–74
 Volleyball League of Serbia and Montenegro
 Winners (1): 2002–03
 Volleyball League of Serbia
 Winners (6): 2007–08, 2011–12, 2012–13, 2013–14, 2014–15, 2015–16

National Cups – 14

 Yugoslav Cup
 Winners (5): 1959–60, 1972, 1973, 1975, 1991
 Serbia and Montenegro Cup
 Winners (3): 1993, 1997, 1999
 Serbian Cup
 Winners (6): 2008–09, 2010–11, 2012–13, 2013–14, 2015–16, 2018–19

National Super Cups – 5 (record)

 Serbian Super Cup
 Winners (5): 2011, 2012, 2013, 2014, 2016

ŽOK Crvena zvezda
National Championships – 28 (record)

 Yugoslav Volleyball Championship
 Winners (18): 1959, 1962, 1963, 1964, 1965, 1966, 1967, 1968–69, 1969–70, 1970–71, 1971–72, 1974–75, 1975–76, 1976–77, 1977–78, 1978–79, 1981–82, 1982–83
 Volleyball League of Serbia and Montenegro
 Winners (5): 1991–92, 1992–93, 2001–02, 2002–03, 2003–04
 Volleyball League of Serbia
 Winners (5): 2009–10, 2010–11, 2011–12, 2012–13, 2021–22

National Cups – 18 (record)

 Yugoslav Cup
 Winners (10): 1960, 1961, 1962, 1972, 1974, 1976–77, 1979, 1982, 1983, 1991
 Serbia and Montenegro Cup
 Winners (2): 1992, 2002
 Serbian Cup
 Winners (6): 2009–10, 2010–11, 2011–12, 2012–13, 2013–14, 2021–22

National Super Cups – 1

 Serbian Super Cup
 Winners (1): 2022

Water polo

VK Crvena zvezda
National Championships – 4

 Serbia and Montenegro League
 Winners (2): 1991–92, 1992–93
 Serbian League
 Winners (2): 2012–13, 2013–14

National Cups – 4

 Serbian Cup
 Winners (4): 2012–13, 2013–14, 2020–21, 2022–23

International titles – 2

 LEN Champions League
 Winners (1): 2012–13
 LEN Super Cup
 Winners (1): 2013

ŽVK Crvena zvezda
 Serbian League
 Winners (5): 2013–14, 2014–15, 2015–16, 2016–17, 2017–18
 Serbian Cup
 Winners (7): 2013, 2014, 2015, 2016, 2017, 2018, 2019

Weightlifting
 National Championships
 Winners (4): 1997, 1998, 2001, 2007

Wrestling

Men
National Championships – 2

 Grappling
 Winners (1): 2010
 Freestyle wrestling
 Winners (1): 2012

Women
National Championships – 9

 Grappling
 Winners (1): 2011
 Freestyle wrestling
 Winners (8): 2011, 2012, 2013, 2016, 2017, 2020, 2021, 2022

National Cups – 1

 Freestyle wrestling
 Winners (1): 2022

References

External links
 Official website

 
Sport in Belgrade
Multi-sport clubs in Serbia
1945 establishments in Serbia
Sports clubs established in 1945